() is a county of the prefecture-level city of Huzhou, in the northwest of Zhejiang province, China. Situated on the southwest shore of Lake Tai, it borders the provinces of Jiangsu to the north and Anhui to the west.

Changxing, established in the third year of Taikang's reign (emperor Wu of Jin) (282 AD) during the Jin Dynasty, has an extensive history of over 1,700 years. It has rich resources, a long cultural heritage, and cherishes its fame as “the realm of fish and rice”, “the home of silk”, “the land of culture”, and “the distinguished county in the southeast China”.

The Changhsingian Age of the Permian Period of geological time is named after Changxing. The stage was named for the Changhsing Limestone.

Since 2004, Changxing has had a Twin City (County) relationship with Kalmar County in Sweden.

Administrative divisions
Towns:
Zhicheng, Changxing (雉城镇), Hongqiao, Changxing (洪桥镇), Lincheng, Changxing (林城镇), Si'an (泗安镇), Xiaopu, Changxing (小浦镇), Heping, Changxing (和平镇), Meishan, Changxing (煤山镇), Jiapu (夹浦镇), Hongxingqiao (虹星桥镇), Lijiaxiang (李家巷镇)

Townships:
Shuikou Township (水口乡), Lüshan Township (吕山乡), Wushan Township (吴山乡), Baixian Township (白岘乡), Huaikan Township (槐坎乡), Erjieling Township (二界岭乡)

Climate

Transport 
 Changxing railway station
 Changxing South railway station
 China National Highway 318
 Nanjing–Hangzhou high-speed railway

Industry 
The largest industries in Changxing county are pattern weaving, machine building and electronics, information technology, and biopharmaceuticals. Some notable companies and enterprises in the county include Hisense air conditioner, Changsheng Group, Zhejiang Changtong, Kingsafe, Top Mondial, and Ju'nen Balance Drink.

Culture
The local "Hundred-leaves dragon dance" (百叶龙舞) features a dragon made from hundreds of lotus leaves.

References

Sources

External links
Changxing County official site (Chinese)
Changxing County official site (English)

County-level divisions of Zhejiang
Huzhou